Lāhainā Noon is a semi-annual tropical solar phenomenon when the Sun culminates at the zenith at solar noon, passing directly overhead (above the subsolar point). The term Lāhainā Noon was coined by the Bishop Museum in Hawai'i.

Details
The subsolar point travels through the tropics. Hawaii is the only US state in the tropics and thus the only one to experience Lāhainā Noon. In 2022, the phenomenon occurred in Honolulu on May 26 and July 16.

Hawaii and other locations between the Tropic of Cancer and Tropic of Capricorn receive the sun's direct rays as the apparent path of the sun passes overhead before and after the summer solstice.

The Lāhainā Noon can occur anywhere from 12:16 to 12:43 p.m. Hawaii–Aleutian Standard Time. At that moment objects that stand straight up (flagpoles, bollards, telephone poles, etc.) cast no outward shadow. The most southerly points in Hawaii experience Lāhainā Noon on earlier and later dates than the northern parts. For example, in 2001 Hilo on the Island of Hawaii encountered the overhead sun around May 18 and July 24, Kahului, Maui on May 24 and July 18, Honolulu, Oahu on May 26 and July 15 and Lihue, Kauai on May 31 and July 11. Between each pair of dates, the sun is slightly to the north at solar noon.

Chosen in a contest sponsored by the Bishop Museum in the 1990s, Lāhainā Noon was the selected appellation because lā hainā (the old name for Lāhainā, Hawaii) means "cruel sun" in the Hawaiian language. The ancient Hawaiian name for the event was kau ka lā i ka lolo which translates as "the sun rests on the brains."

Subsolar dates

In popular culture
The event is covered by Hawaii media.

Activities are associated with the event. The phenomenon occurs in stories, including "Lāhainā Noon" by Eric Paul Shaffer (Leaping Dog, 2005), which won the Ka Palapala Po'okela book award for Excellence in "Aloha from beyond Hawai'i".

Sky Gate, a unique sculpture in Honolulu created by world-renowned artist and landscape architect Isamu Noguchi, features a bendy, bumpy ring that drastically changes height as it goes around. Most of the year, it makes a curvy, twisted shadow on the ground, but during "Lahaina Noon", the height-changing ring casts a perfect circular shadow on the ground.

See also 
 Qibla observation by shadows
 Sundial
 Zero shadow day

References

Further reading

External links
Annual Astronomy Highlights link has current "Lahaina Noon" dates updated by the Bernice P. Bishop Museum
Picture of "Lahaina Noon" by the Honolulu Star-Bulletin, note the street sign
Picture of "Lahaina Noon" by the Honolulu Star-Bulletin

Hawaii culture
Sun